The Golden Triangle of Jakarta or can also be referred to as Medan Merdeka–Thamrin–Sudirman Axis or Sudirman–Thamrin–Kuningan Axis (is), is a roughly triangular area in the center of Jakarta, Indonesia, extending from Central Jakarta to South Jakarta. Most of the city's foreign embassies and tallest skyscrapers are located in the area, which is the main CBD of Jakarta. The area is bordered by main avenues of Jakarta: Jalan M.H. Thamrin-Jalan Jenderal Sudirman (north-southwest), Jalan H.R. Rasuna Said (north-southeast), and Jalan Jenderal Gatot Subroto (east-west). There are many other roads bisecting the area. The Golden Triangle's commercial areas include SCBD (45 hectares), Mega Kuningan (54 hectares), Rasuna Epicentrum (53.6 hectares) and Kuningan Persada (17 hectares). The Golden Triangle is one of the fastest evolving CBDs in the Asia-Pacific region.

History and geography 

From 1960-1965, Jakarta's urban development changed drastically when President Sukarno, also an architect and an urban planner, redeveloped the city into a modern capital that would not only be the pride of the Indonesian nation, but also be a "beacon" of a powerful new nation. During the 1950s, the development axis of Jakarta was shifted southward from Medan Merdeka to Kebayoran as the center of Jakarta, replacing the axis of Medan Merdeka-Senen-Salemba-Jatinegara, which had grown since the 18th century.

Some of the notable infrastructure projects of Sukarno during the first half of the 1960s were construction of wide avenues, such as Jalan Thamrin, Jalan Sudirman, Jalan Gatot Subroto and Semanggi "clover-leaf" interchange. Jalan Rasuna Said was developed in the 1970s and together with Jalan Sudirman, and Jalan Gatot Subroto formed the Golden Triangle. During the period, construction commenced north of the Semanggi Interchange on Jalan Sudirman. 

The usage of the term "the Golden Triangle" for the Jakarta CBD was popularized in the 1990s. Three points of the triangle which forms the area are:
Youth statue in Kebayoran Baru, South Jakarta
Arjuna statue in Merdeka Square, Central Jakarta
Dirgantara statue in Pancoran, South Jakarta 
The golden triangle area of Jakarta includes major roads such as Thamrin, Sudirman, Gatot Subroto, Rasuna Said and Mas Mansyur and Satrio. Administratively, the Golden Triangle area is located in Menteng, Tanah Abang, Setiabudi, Kebayoran Baru, a small part in Tebet, Pancoran, and Mampang Prapatan sub-districts of Jakarta.

Important areas in the Golden Triangle

Many commercial centers have been developed gradually as clusters within the Golden Triangle area, such as Hotel Indonesia roundabout, SCBD, Mega Kuningan. Most of the skyscrapers of Jakarta are located within this triangle.

Many commercial, shopping and hotels are located in and around Hotel Indonesia roundabout, such as Grand Indonesia, Plaza Indonesia, Thamrin Nine, Hotel Indonesia, Wisma Nusantara, Menara BCA. Embassy of Japan, Germany, and France are situated on Jalan M.H. Thamrin, close to the roundabout. Bank Indonesia headquarter and first high-rise building of Jakarta Sarinah also located at Jalan M.H. Thamrin.
Numerous high-rise building and skyscrapers are located along Sudirman Avenue, such as Wisma 46, Menara Astra, Sinarmas MSIG Tower, International Financial Center Jakarta, World Trade Center Jakarta, Sahid Sudirman Center. 
SCBD is a mixed development cluster of 45 hectares located at Jalan Jenderal Sudirman. The area has many commercial skyscraper, shopping and entertainment center. District 8, Pacific Place Jakarta, Indonesia Stock Exchange, The Energy, PCPD Tower, Sequis Center Tower, Equity Tower located within the district. As of June, 2017 the 2nd tallest building in Indonesia, Treasury Tower is located in the district at present. Jakarta Signature Tower, which is under construction, once completed this will be the tallest building in the city and  5th tallest building in the world, is also located in the district.
Legislative seat of Indonesia DPR/MPR Building located in between Jalan Jenderal Sudirman and Jalan Jenderal Gatot Subroto. Gelora Bung Karno Sports Complex, JCC, Plaza Senayan, Senayan City, FX Sudirman, Jakarta Metropolitan Police Headquarter located in and around Senayan area of Golden Triangle.
Tallest building of Jakarta Gama Tower located at Rasuna Said Road. Foreign embassies of Australia, Malaysia, Singapore, Russia, Poland, Netherlands, Switzerland, Hungary, Bosnia and Herzegovina, Turkey, Algeria, Bangladesh, and India are located at this road.
Mega Kuningan is a densely concentrated district of high rise buildings with a land area of about 55 hectares. Important buildings in the area are World Capital Tower, BTPN Towers, JW Marriott Jakarta, Ritz-Carlton Hotel, Ciputra World Jakarta complex etc.
Rasuna Epicentrum is an area of 53.6 hectares, consisting of residential, offices, hotels, hospitals, places of worship, sports, shopping and entertainment and education in one area.
Gatot Subroto Avenue runs east-west direction within Golden Triangle. It is now going through a transformation of building new skyscrapers. Four Seasons Hotel Tower, Telkom Landmark Complex, The Tower, Mangkuluhur City located in this road.

Monuments 

There are lots of monuments at the Golden Triangle area. One of them is the National Monument as the main symbol and icon of Jakarta and Indonesia. Other monuments, such as the Statue of Arjuna Wijaya near the Bank Indonesia head office, Statue of Mohammad Hoesni Thamrin at the front of Bank Indonesia Roundabout, the Selamat Datang Monument at the Hotel Indonesia Roundabout at the front of the Grand Indonesia Shopping Town, Statue of General Sudirman, Youth Monument, and the Dirgantara Monument.

Streets 

The Golden Triangle area is formed by three major streets where most skyscrapers, business centers, and foreign embassies in Jakarta are located on those streets. Those three major streets are:

 Jalan M.H. Thamrin
 Jalan Jenderal Sudirman
 Jalan Jenderal Gatot Subroto

Traffic Restrictions 

As the main streets of the central business district, the streets becomes the most busiest area in Jakarta with lots of heavy traffic. To reduce the gridlock on the Golden Triangle Area, since the 1990s, the Government of Jakarta began to implement the High-occupancy vehicle lane (HOV) 3+ (known as Three in One or 3 in 1) scheme on the West Medan Merdeka, Sudirman, Thamrin, and Gatot Subroto Streets. The 3 in 1 scheme was failed due to lots of Sluggers or "car jockeys". The 3 in 1 scheme was replaced by the Odd–even rationing in 2016. Currently the odd–even rationing is implemented every Monday to Friday from 06:00-10:00 and from 16:00-21:00 on West Medan Merdeka, Sudirman, Thamrin, Gatot Subroto and 22 other streets in Jakarta.

Car Free Day 
To reduce air pollution as the major impact of the gridlock at the Golden Triangle area, In September 2007, the Government of Jakarta held the city's first Car-Free Day that closed the main avenue of the city from cars and invited local pedestrian to exercise and having their activities on the streets that were normally full of cars and traffic. Along the road from the Senayan traffic circle on Jalan Sudirman, to the Selamat Datang Monument at the Hotel Indonesia Roundabout on Jalan Thamrin, all the way north to National Monument Central Jakarta, cars are cleared out for pedestrians. Since May 2012 Car-Free Day in Jakarta is held every Sunday. It is held on the main avenues of the city, Jalan Sudirman and Jalan Thamrin, from Senayan area to Monas (Monumen Nasional), from 6 AM to 11 AM.

Transportation

The area is served by TransJakarta Corridor 1, Corridor 6, Corridor 9. There are many routes operated by Kopaja, Mayasari Bakti and APTB buses. Sudirman, Cikini and Gondangdia station of KRL Commuterline are located within the area. The North-South line of the Jakarta MRT crosses the area with multiple stations. The area will be also served by the Greater Jakarta LRT. Here are the lists of transportation services that serves the Golden Triangle Area:

Bus Routes 
 TransJakarta
 Corridor  
 Corridor  
 Corridor 
 Kopaja (defunct)
 Metro Mini (defunct)
 Mayasari Bakti
 APTB

Train Lines 
 Jakarta MRT
 North-South Line 
 East–West Line (planned)
 Greater Jakarta LRT
 Cibubur Line 
 Bekasi Line 
 KRL Commuterline
 Bogor Line 
 Rangkasbitung Line 
 Cikarang Loop Line 
 Soekarno–Hatta Airport Rail Link

See also

Jalan M.H. Thamrin
Jalan Jenderal Sudirman
Jalan H.R. Rasuna Said
Jalan Prof. Dr. Satrio
Jalan Jenderal Gatot Subroto
Sudirman Central Business District
Mega Kuningan

References

Central business districts in Indonesia
Buildings and structures in Jakarta
Post-independence architecture of Indonesia
Central Jakarta
South Jakarta